Edward Newell was a British cyclist. He competed in two events at the 1920 Summer Olympics.

References

External links
 

Year of birth missing
Year of death missing
British male cyclists
Olympic cyclists of Great Britain
Cyclists at the 1920 Summer Olympics
Place of birth missing